A correspondent is a reporter. correspondent or foreign correspondent may also refer to:

Arts, entertainment, and media
De Correspondent (in English also The Correspondent), a Dutch news website 
Foreign Correspondent (film), an Alfred Hitchcock film
Foreign Correspondent (TV series), an Australian current affairs programme
The Correspondent, a foreign affairs and defense publication produced by Harvard University between 1961 and 1965
The Correspondents (band), a London-based swing/hip-hop duo made up of DJ 'Chucks' and MC and lead singer 'Mr Bruce'.
The Sunday Correspondent, a short-lived British weekly newspaper

Roles
Correspondent bank, a bank's foreign agent that operates on its behalf in that country.
Foreign correspondent (journalism)

See also
Co-respondent, the "other person" in a suit for divorce on grounds of adultery
Correspondence (disambiguation)
Pen pal